Rufus and Amanda Black House is a historic home located in Sugar Creek Township, Hancock County, Indiana.  It was built about 1870, and is a two-story, "L"-shaped, Italianate style brick dwelling.  It features an original two-story porch.

It was listed on the National Register of Historic Places in 2014.

References

Houses on the National Register of Historic Places in Indiana
Italianate architecture in Indiana
Houses completed in 1870
Buildings and structures in Hancock County, Indiana
National Register of Historic Places in Hancock County, Indiana